Ana María Campoy (26 July 1925 – 8 July 2006) was an Argentine actress of Colombian origin. She was born in Bogotá, the child of a couple of actors who had a theatre company in Spain. She began acting at the age of 4, and at 17 she formed her own company.

In 1947, while in Guatemala, she married Argentine actor and director Pepe Cibrián, with whom she had two sons. Two years later they settled in Argentina. There, Campoy acted on TV, cinema and theatre; she also published a book of love stories. She received two Martín Fierro Awards, a Konex Award for her comedy acting, and a Podestá Award to her career in theatre.

Campoy died of recurring pneumonia in a hospital of Buenos Aires in 2006, two weeks before turning 81.

Filmography

1937: Aurora de esperanza
1942: La madre guapa
1942: Un marido a precio fijo
1943: A Sight of Light
1944: Doce lunas de miel
1944: Adam's Fault
1944: Paraíso sin Eva
1944: El testamento del virrey
1944: Ella, él y sus millones
1945: Espronceda
1945: Tierra sedienta
1945: Cinco lobitos
1945: Un hombre de negocios
1946: Es peligroso asomarse al exterior
1946: Cais do Sodré
1947: Five Faces of Woman
1951: The Strange Case of the Man and the Beast
1951: Especialista en señoras
1951: Teleteatro de suspenso (TV Series)
1951: Néstor Villegas vigila (TV Series)
1953: Como te quiero Ana (TV Series, 3 episodes)
1954: Siete gritos en el mar
1956: Cubitos de hielo
1958: Cómo te odio, Pepe (TV Series)
1960: Topaze (TV Mini Series, 10 episodes)
1964: Conjugal Pleasures
1965: Show Rambler (TV Movie)
1966: Con el más puro amor
1967: Las pirañas
1971: Teatro 13 (TV Series, 1 episode)
1970-1971: Alta comedia (TV Series, 9 episodes)
1974: Mi hombre sin noche (TV Series, 19 episodes)
1974: Humor a la italiana (TV Series,1 episode)
1976: Juan que reía
1977: El humor de Niní Marshall (TV Movie)
1978: Te sigo queriendo Ana (TV Series)
1978: Chau, amor mío (TV Series)
1981: La Torre en jaque (TV Series, 9 episodes)
1983: Compromiso (TV Series, 10 episodes)
1986: El infiel (TV Series, 40 episodes)
1986: Las lobas
1987: La cuñada (TV Series, 264 episodes)
1988: Amándote (TV Series, 112 episodes)
1989: Las hormigas (TV Series)
1989: The Strange Lady (TV Series, 120 episodes)
1990:Stress (TV Series, 7 episodes)
1991: Stress Internacional (TV Series, 3 episodes)
1991: El gordo y el flaco (TV Series, 19 episodes)
1992: Soy Gina (TV Series, 90 episodes)
1992: Peor es nada (TV Series, 1 episode)
2003: Dr. Amor (TV Series, 119 episodes)

References
 La Nación. 8 July 2006. Murió Ana María Campoy.

External links
 
 

1925 births
2006 deaths
20th-century Argentine actresses
20th-century Colombian actresses
Actresses from Bogotá
Argentine film actresses
Colombian film actresses
Argentine stage actresses
Colombian stage actresses
Argentine television actresses
Colombian television actresses
Colombian emigrants to Argentina
Deaths from pneumonia in Argentina